Kittu crater is a crater on Jupiter's moon Ganymede.

The crater shows a bright white central peak and rim, and dark brownish material surrounding it. Diffuse dark rays, sprinkled thinly atop surrounding grooved terrain, emanate from the impact site. The dark material dusted over the surface is probably part of a dark impactor (asteroid or comet) which was strewn across the surface upon impact. The impactor hit grooved terrain, and a straight segment of the crater's rim was created when a portion of the rim collapsed along the trend of an older fault.

References

Impact craters on Ganymede (moon)